A screwball is a baseball and fastpitch softball pitch.

Screwball or Screwballs may also refer to:

 Screwball (group), an American hip-hop group
 Screwball, nickname of George Beurling (1921–1948), Canada's top flying ace of the Second World War
 Screwball (ice cream), a frozen dessert
 The Screwball, a Woody Woodpecker animated cartoon short subject
 Screwballs, a 1983 Canadian comedy film
 Screwy Squirrel, also known as Screwball Squirrel, an MGM cartoon character of the 1940s
 Screwball, an enemy of Spider-Man in the Marvel Comics universe

See also 
 Screwball comedy, a film genre
 Ball screw, a mechanical linear actuator
 Ball screw or ball puller, an accessory for a musket